Pharsalia granulipennis is a species of beetle in the family Cerambycidae. It was described by Stephan von Breuning and de Jong in 1941. It is known from Java.

References

granulipennis
Beetles described in 1941